Nur Ain Nabilah Tarmizi (born 2 March 1998) is a Malaysian international lawn bowler. She is a Southeast Asian Games double gold medalist and has represented Malaysia at the Commonwealth Games winning a silver medal.

Biography
She has twice won the gold medal at the Lawn bowls at the Southeast Asian Games, in 2017 and 2019 in the fours event.

In 2022, she was selected for the 2022 Commonwealth Games in Birmingham, where she competed in the men's pairs triples and the women's fours event. In the triples, the team of Tarmizi, Syafiqa Haidar Afif Abdul Rahman and Azlina Arshad secured a silver medal but lost the final to England.

References

1998 births
Living people
Malaysian female bowls players
Bowls players at the 2022 Commonwealth Games
Commonwealth Games competitors for Malaysia
Commonwealth Games medallists in lawn bowls
Commonwealth Games silver medallists for Malaysia
Competitors at the 2017 Southeast Asian Games
Competitors at the 2019 Southeast Asian Games
Southeast Asian Games medalists in lawn bowls
Southeast Asian Games gold medalists for Malaysia
Medallists at the 2022 Commonwealth Games